Genji is a district of the West Welega Zone of Oromia Region in Ethiopia.

References 

Districts of Oromia Region